was a Japanese Buddhist scholar and priest within the Ōtani-ha branch of Shin Buddhism, and a professor of Otani University who specialized in pre-sectarian Buddhism.

Life
Akanuma was born in Nagaoka city, Niigata Prefecture in 1884. 
He attended Yamabe training at a private school operated by Shin Buddhism in 1909.
In 1919, he was appointed professor of Shinshu University and gave lectures on pre-sectarian Buddhism and Pali language.
In 1933 he became a Department of Otani University Faculty Professor, held Pre-sectarian Buddhist Course and Pali Language Course.
He died in 1937 at his home .

Publication
The comparative catalogue of Chinese Āgamas & Pāli Nikāyas / by Chizen Akanuma
 CiNii>赤沼智善

External links
A Digital Comparative Catalog of Āgama Literature

1884 births
1938 deaths
Japanese scholars of Buddhism
Academic staff of Ōtani University
Jōdo Shinshū Buddhist priests
20th-century Buddhist monks